The 1986 NCAA men's volleyball tournament was the 17th annual tournament to determine the national champion of NCAA men's collegiate volleyball. The tournament was played at Rec Hall in University Park, Pennsylvania during May 1986.

Pepperdine defeated USC in the final match, 3–2 (7–15, 15–13, 15–11, 5–15, 16–14), to win their third national title. This was a rematch of the previous year's final, also won by Pepperdine. The Waves (22–7) were coached by Rod Wilde.

Pepperdines's Steve Friedman was named the tournament's Most Outstanding Player. Friedman, along with six other players, also comprised the All-tournament team.

Qualification
Until the creation of the NCAA Men's Division III Volleyball Championship in 2012, there was only a single national championship for men's volleyball. As such, all NCAA men's volleyball programs, whether from Division I, Division II, or Division III, were eligible. A total of 4 teams were invited to contest this championship.

Tournament bracket 
Site: Rec Hall, University Park, Pennsylvania

All tournament team 
Steve Friedman, Pepperdine (Most outstanding player)
Rob Scott, Pepperdine
Matt Rigg, Pepperdine
Dave Yoder, USC
Rudy Dvorak, USC
Adam Johnson, USC
Chris Chase, Penn State

See also 
 NCAA Men's National Collegiate Volleyball Championship
 NCAA Division I Women's Volleyball Championship

References

1986
NCAA Men's Volleyball Championship
NCAA Men's Volleyball Championship
1986 in sports in Pennsylvania
May 1986 sports events in the United States
Volleyball in Pennsylvania